Pike Corner is a 15.2 hectare biological Site of Special Scientific Interest in north Wiltshire, England, notified in 1986. The site lies southwest of Ashton Keynes village and covers two low-lying meadows in the floodplain of the Swill Brook.

For many years the meadows have been grazed without ploughing or the use of artificial fertilisers, therefore they have a rich flora with several meadow species that are now uncommon in southern England.

Sources

 Natural England details and citation sheet for the site (accessed 23 June 2021)

External links
 Natural England website (SSSI information)

Sites of Special Scientific Interest in Wiltshire
Sites of Special Scientific Interest notified in 1986